David Eugene Rosenbaum (March 1, 1942 – January 8, 2006) was an American journalist, particularly known for his coverage of politics—in Washington, D.C., and nationally—for The New York Times.

His death led to nationally noted reforms of the emergency services in Washington, D.C.

Origins, education and early career
Rosenbaum was a native of Miami, Florida, and grew up in Tampa, Florida, where his father developed a citrus cannery.

In 1963, Rosenbaum earned his bachelor's degree from Dartmouth College (where he was a member of the Kappa Kappa Kappa local fraternity), and in 1965, a master's degree in journalism from Columbia University.

After his education, Rosenbaum worked for a number of publications including the St. Petersburg Times, a string of suburban newspapers in London, England, and the Congressional Quarterly, before moving to The New York Times.

Career at The New York Times
Rosenbaum worked for The New York Times for 35 years, beginning in 1968. Throughout his career, he worked as the editor or chief correspondent for many departments at the newspaper, including 
Congressional, domestic policy, economics, and business. He also worked as assistant news editor for the newspaper.

Except for his three years as a Times special-projects editor in the 1980s, most of Rosenbaum's Times career was spent in the Times' Washington Bureau. Rosenbaum covered the 1970s Senate Watergate hearings, the 1980s Iran-Contra Affair, the restructuring of Medicare and Social Security, and various budget and tax debates between Congress and the White House.

Rosenbaum was particularly known for distilling complex governmental issues into readily understood analyses of their effects on people's lives. His popular feature, "The Fine Print", dissected pending policies and legislation, revealing hidden, perplexing or hypocritical facts about current bills and new laws.

Rosenbaum also covered national politics. In 1996, 2000, and 2004, he directed Times coverage of the New Hampshire presidential primaries, and covered the 2004 general election campaign.

Though he retired in late 2005, Rosenbaum kept his desk at the Times Washington Bureau, and planned continuing as a contributing writer. Just before his death in early 2006, he was working on a preliminary Times obituary of former President Gerald Ford.

In 1991, Rosenbaum was a co-recipient of the Polk Award for his coverage of the 1990 tax hike by then President George H. W. Bush—sharing the honor with journalist Susan Rasky.

In 2012, six years after Rosenbaum's death, his byline appeared on the Times obituary for recently deceased 1968 Democratic Presidential nominee George McGovern—whom Rosenbaum had covered in earlier years. Rosenbaum had been tasked to write McGovern's obituary years earlier, in accordance with the Times practice of preparing and storing obituaries for notable people while they are still alive.

Leadership and teaching
For 25 years, Rosenbaum served on the steering committee of The Reporters Committee for Freedom of the Press

Rosenbaum mentored younger reporters, and taught at his alma mater, Dartmouth College, at Stanford University, and at other colleges and universities.

Death and aftermath
Rosenbaum's 2006 death, under dramatic circumstances, led to reforms in the troubled emergency services system of the District of Columbia, and brought attention to related public safety issues nationwide.

Death
Less than a month after his retirement, Rosenbaum died on January 8, 2006, from a brain injury caused by a blow to the head during a robbery on January 6, near his Washington, D.C. home. Emergency services personnel mistakenly thought him intoxicated, and delayed his treatment, and emergency room staff at Howard University Hospital ignored him for hours—factors alleged to contribute to his death.

Criminal case
After store surveillance cameras revealed they had used Rosenbaum's credit cards, Michael C. Hamlin and Percy Jordan, Jr. turned themselves into authorities and confessed to the robbery. Hamlin agreed to testify against his cousin, Percy Jordan, Jr., accusing him of killing Rosenbaum with a heavy plastic pipe. Both men were convicted, and sent to prison.

System reform settlement
Rosenbaum's family—including his widow, Virginia (a prominent corporate governance analyst, for many years lead analyst for Washington's Investor Responsibility Research Center), brother, Marcus (a senior editor at NPR in Washington), son, Daniel (a photographer for The Washington Times), daughter, Dottie, and son-in-law, Toby—charged Washington's emergency services system with contributing to Rosenbaum’s death. An investigation validated their concerns.

The D.C. inspector general's "scathing", high-profile, public report described the circumstances of Rosenbaum's death as "an unacceptable chain of failure", blaming delayed or inappropriate responses by firefighters, paramedics, police officers and hospital staff—and citing systemic and cultural failures that plagued the District's emergency services system. The report led to a public apology by the City's Fire and EMS Chief, and drew national attention to the issues raised about emergency services nationwide.

Rosenbaum's family agreed to forgo a suit against the city in exchange for the creation of a task force to investigate and improve Washington's emergency services. In cooperation with incoming Washington mayor Adrian Fenty (who had conferred with Rosenbaum's survivors before his election), the Rosenbaum family's settlement with authorities, signed in March, 2007, produced the Task Force on Emergency Medical Services (often called the "Rosenbaum EMS task force"). The task force produced numerous recommendations for emergency services reform in Washington, D.C.

Reforms followed. By the start of 2008, the District of Columbia got a new fire chief and a full-time medical director, began electronic tracking of patient interactions, and enhanced its oversight of emergency services.

However, in 2009, many issues remained unresolved, and the Rosenbaum task force remained active.

Family aftermath
Rosenbaum's widow, Virginia ("Ginny") Rosenbaum—his wife for 39 years—died of cancer June 22, 2006, only five months after her husband.

Rosenbaum’s son-in-law, Toby Halliday, served as a member of the Rosenbaum EMS task force.

In 2007, Washington's pre-eminent local magazine, Washingtonian, named Rosenbaum's family "Washingtonians of the Year 2007" for their decision to forgo a $20 million lawsuit against the city, over Rosenbaum's death, in exchange for Washington's reform of its emergency services.

Honors and awards
 1991: Polk Award (co-recipient) for coverage of the 1990 tax hike by then President George H. W. Bush. Shared with journalist Susan Rasky.
 Posthumous: David E. Rosenbaum Reporting Internship in Washington, D.C., sponsored by The New York Times.

References

External links
"Remembrances of David Rosenbaum", January 10, 2006, The New York Times retrieved 2016-08-02. (Extensive biographical anecdotes and comments about Rosenbaum from numerous personal and professional acquaintances, including close friends, several public officials and many prominent journalists.)

Summary of IG Investigation
David Rosenbaum profile at Internet Accuracy Project
 "David E. Rosenbaum", on RootsWeb.com, which contains unnattributed (and possibly altered) excerpts from published articles about Rosenbaum and about his life, work, death and aftermath.
 "David E. Rosenbaum", The New York Times, an index of several web pages, listing collected articles by or about Rosenbaum—including remembrances from colleagues, news about Mr. Rosenbaum’s death, and an extensive archive of over 2,000 of his articles dating back to 1981.

1942 births
2006 deaths
Writers from Miami
Dartmouth College alumni
Columbia University Graduate School of Journalism alumni
The New York Times writers
George Polk Award recipients
Murdered American journalists
People murdered in Washington, D.C.
Deaths by beating in the United States
Writers from Tampa, Florida